Durso is a surname. Notable people with the surname include:

Edwin Durso, American television executive
Joe Durso (1924–2004), American sportswriter 
Joe Durso (handballer) (born 1955), American handball player
John Durso Jr., American communications consultant
Robert Durso (born 1959), Italian-American pianist
Rodney Durso, American contemporary artist and graphic designer